Leo Meyer may refer to:
 Leo Meyer (baseball) (1888–1968), shortstop for the Brooklyn Dodgers in 1909
 Leo J. Meyer (1917–2006), U.S. Army officer and Combat Infantryman Badge recipient
 Leo Meyer (philologist) (1830–1910), German philologist
 Father Leo Meyer, S.M., founder of the predecessor of the University of Dayton, Ohio, USA in 1849
 Leo Meyer (producer) (1873–1944), producer of the 1928 film Sex in Chains
 Leo Meyer (died 1961), founder and boss of British housebuilding company Ideal Homes
 Leo Meyer (politician) (1873–1964), Oklahoma's first Jew elected to statewide public office (State Auditor)